"To a T" is a song recorded by American country music singer Ryan Hurd. It was released on September 1, 2018, as the lead single from his EP  Platonic. Hurd's wife Maren Morris sings the harmony vocals. Hurd, Laura Veltz and Nathan Spicer are the song's writers.

Background
Hurd told PopCulture.com that "'To a T' is a love song, but it's like a sexy love song." He added, "the song title's double meaning are knowing someone 'To a T' and getting them into just a t-shirt is intentional."

Music video
The music video was released on February 15, 2019. It about real love and real people play every stage of a relationship from new beginnings to a senior couple dancing in the kitchen.

Commercial performance
As of January 2020, the song has sold 61,000 copies in US.

The song reached No.23 on Hot Country Songs chart, becoming Hurd's first entry.

Charts

Weekly charts

Year-end charts

Certifications

References

2019 singles
2019 songs
Ryan Hurd songs
Songs written by Ryan Hurd
Songs written by Laura Veltz
Song recordings produced by Dann Huff
RCA Records Nashville singles